The Governor Mifflin School District is located in southern Berks County in southeastern Pennsylvania in the United States.

Schools
The district comprises 6 schools, located throughout the district.

Governor Mifflin Senior High School, serving grades 9–12, located in Shillington. The principal is Mr. Steve Murray.
Governor Mifflin Middle School, serving grades 7–8, located in Shillington. The principal is Mr. Tony Alvarez.
Governor Mifflin Intermediate School, serving grades 5–6, located in Cumru Township (the listed address is Shillington). The principal is Mr. Cory Crider (former Asst. Principal until 2021).
Mifflin Park Elementary, serving grades K–4, located in Cumru Township (the listed address is Shillington). The principal is Mrs. Melissa Paparella.
Cumru Elementary, serving grades K–4, located in Cumru Township (the listed address is Shillington). The principal is Mr. Chad Curry.
Brecknock Elementary, serving grades K–4, located in Brecknock Township (the listed address is Mohnton). The principal is Mr. Aaron Kopetsky.

Sports

The Governor Mifflin School District has sports for the fall, winter, and spring. These sports are divided between the middle school and the high school. The middle school sports for the fall are cross country, soccer, cheerleading, field hockey, football, and volleyball. The high school sports for the fall are cross country, soccer, water polo, cheerleading, field hockey, football, tennis, and golf. The middle school sports for the winter are basketball, cheerleading, and wrestling. The high school sports for the winter are basketball, bowling, indoor track and field, swimming and diving, cheerleading, rifle, and wrestling. The middle school sports for the spring are baseball, track and field, and softball. The high school sports for the spring are baseball, lacrosse, track and field, tennis, volleyball, and softball.

References

External links
 

School districts in Berks County, Pennsylvania